Paul Newbold (12 August 1945 – 18 November 2016) was a British economist known for his contributions to econometrics and time series analysis. His most famous contribution was a 1974 paper co-authored with Clive Granger which introduced the concept of spurious regressions.

Newbold earned his B.Sc. from London School of Economics and his Ph.D. under supervision of George E. P. Box at University of Wisconsin–Madison. He later was a professor most notably at the University of Illinois at Urbana–Champaign and the University of Nottingham. He also taught courses on time series analysis while on sabbatical at the University of Chicago Graduate School of Business (now the University of Chicago Booth School of Business). He has written a very popular and thorough statistics textbook: "Statistics for Business and Economics" along with W L Carlson and B Thorne, now in its 8th edition. He also co-authored with Clive Granger the influential textbook: "Forecasting Economic Time Series" (2nd ed; Academic Press, 1986).

References 

1945 births
2016 deaths
British economists
Time series econometricians
Alumni of the London School of Economics
University of Wisconsin–Madison alumni
People from Sileby